Cyprus competed at the 2011 Commonwealth Youth Games in Isle of Man from 7 to 13 September 2011.The Cyprus National Olympic Committee selected 11 competitors. Cyprus won three gold medals and three bronze medals. They finished eleventh in the medal table.

References

Nations at the 2011 Commonwealth Youth Games
2011 in Cypriot sport
Cyprus at multi-sport events